Ning Hai was a light cruiser in the Republic of China Navy (ROCN) before World War II and the lead ship of her class. She was sunk in the early days of the Second Sino-Japanese War by aircraft from the Imperial Japanese Navy, and her wreck was raised and repaired by the Japanese, re-entering service with the Japanese Navy in the Pacific War as the escort vessel . She was sunk again in September 1944 by a USN submarine.

Background
By the end of the 1920s, the ROCN had only four antiquated 19th century protected cruisers and two training cruisers received before World War I. The Kuomintang government had an ambitious re-armament plan but lacked funds, and after extensive negotiations with shipbuilders in the United States, United Kingdom, Germany and Japan, placed an order with the Japanese for one light cruiser to be built in Japan, with a second vessel to be built in China with Japanese assistance. Despite the very strained political relations between Japan and China and the strenuous objections of the Japanese military, Harima Shipyards completed the first cruiser in 1932.

Design
Ning Hai was based on the experimental Japanese cruiser , which combined a small size with heavy weaponry, but in an even smaller displacement of only . As with Yūbari, Ning Hai has a single trunked smokestack, and a tripod bridge arrangement. Her weaponry was comparable to ships with a larger displacement:  six 14 cm/50 3rd Year Type naval guns mounted in three double gun turrets, six 8 cm/40 3rd Year Type naval guns, and dual 533-mm torpedo tubes. Ning Hai also had a small hangar for two seaplanes; two Aichi AB-3 biplanes, one bought from Japan and one built locally using a spare engine and domestic materials, were assigned to it. There was no aircraft catapult, and the seaplanes were hoisted onto and deployed using a crane.

However, the vessel was underpowered, with three antiquated vertical four-cylinder triple-expansion steam engines, two of which were coal-fired, yielding a top speed of only 22 knots. The excessive top-weight of the design also created stability problems.  Due to these issues, Ning Hai was suitable only for coastal operations against gunboats or smaller vessels.

Operational history
Ning Hai was laid down at Harima Shipyards in Aioi, Hyogo, Japan on 20 February 1931, launched on 10 October 1931 and completed 30 July 1932. She was commissioned on 1 September 1932 as the flagship of the Republic of China Navy (ROCN), serving in that capacity until the commissioning of Ping Hai in April 1937. She returned to Japan in May 1933 for repairs, and again in June 1934 for the funeral of Japanese Fleet Admiral Tōgō Heihachirō. She again underwent repairs before her return to China

As one of the more powerful surface combatants within the small ROCN, following the start of the Second Sino-Japanese War, Ning Hai was a target of the Imperial Japanese Navy since the Battle of Shanghai, but it was not until 23 September, during the Japanese assault on Kiangyin Fortress (which guarded a segment of Yangtze River near Nanking), that Ning Hai came under severe attack by Japanese bombers, sustaining four bomb hits while Ping Hai was hit by eight bombs and sunk. Ning Hai escaped but on 25 September when Yokosuka B3Y1 torpedo bombers scored two direct hits, sinking her in shallow water. These airstrikes were launched from both the aircraft carrier  and airfields around Japanese-occupied Shanghai. The Imperial Japanese Navy captured the wreck on 5 December 1937.

An attempt to re-float Ning Hai by the Japanese in April, 1938 was unsuccessful with two salvage divers killed. An attempt on 4 May 1938 was successful, and the hulk was towed to Shanghai for basic repairs. Originally the Japanese planned for the vessel to be the flagship of the collaborationist navy established by the Nanjing Nationalist Government, but instead opted to have her towed to Sasebo Naval District, where on 11 July the vessel was re-classified as the training vessel and coastal defense ship . However the ship was moored permanently at Sasebo as barracks hulk from July 1938 to December 1943.

In December 1943, with Japanese maritime traffic under increasing pressure from Allied submarine warfare, Mikura was towed to the Harima Shipyards for reconstruction into a "Kaibōkan" (escort ship). After training in the Seto Inland Sea, she escorted a convoy of transports to Iwo Jima from 22–31 July, escaping a torpedo attack by an unknown submarine on 26 July.

Notes

References

External links

http://www.globalsecurity.org/military/world/japan/exchina-cl.htm
https://web.archive.org/web/20100510015014/http://big5.chinabroadcast.cn/gate/big5/gb.cri.cn/3821/2004/08/26/151@280506.htm

Ning Hai-class cruisers
Ships built by IHI Corporation
1931 ships
Second Sino-Japanese War cruisers of China
Cruisers sunk by aircraft
Ships sunk by Japanese aircraft
Escort ships of the Imperial Japanese Navy
Ships sunk by American submarines
World War II shipwrecks in the Pacific Ocean
Maritime incidents in September 1944
Naval ships of the Republic of China captured by Japan during World War II